Choplin is a French surname. It may refer to
Grégory Choplin (born 1980), French-Ivorian Muay Thai kickboxer
Jérémy Choplin (born 1985), French football player

See also
Choplin (チョップリン), Japanese comedy duo from the Kansai area

French-language surnames